"Across the River" is a song by American musical group Bruce Hornsby and the Range. The song was co-written by Bruce Hornsby and his brother John. Released in June 1990, it peaked at number 18 on the US Billboard Hot 100 and number one on Canada's RPM Top Singles chart.

Track listings
7-inch and cassette single
 "Across the River" (single edit) – 4:43
 "Fire on the Cross" – 4:38

12-inch and CD single
 "Across the River" (single edit) – 4:43
 "Fire on the Cross" – 4:38
 "Mandolin Rain" (live version) – 6:31

Japanese mini-CD single
 "Across the River" – 5:13
 "Fire on the Cross" – 4:37

Charts

Weekly charts

Year-end charts

Release history

References

External links
 Bruce Hornsby Artist Biography

1990 singles
1990 songs
Bruce Hornsby songs
Songs written by Bruce Hornsby
Songs written by John Hornsby
RPM Top Singles number-one singles